Syed Muhammed Junaid Zaidi; known as S. M. Junaid Zaidi (born 19 July 1949) is a Pakistani scientist , entrepreneur and educator. He is the founding rector of the COMSATS University Islamabad.

Junaid Zaidi(S.I,H.I) took the post of the Executive Director of Commission on Science and Technology for Sustainable Development (COMSATS) in Islamabad, Pakistan on February 27, 2017.

Early life and education
Junaid Zaidi was born in Rawalpindi in 1949. After getting his master's degrees in Mathematics and Physics from the University of the Punjab, in 1981 he got another degree in Operations Research from the University of Birmingham. He completed his doctoral work at the University of Birmingham in 1984, specializing in optimization of algorithms on networking. On July 19, 2012, Lancaster University, UK, conferred on Zaidi the Honorary Degree of Doctor of Science.

Positions held
He has served the government of Pakistan as the Director General of the National Center for Technology Transfer, (1991–95) and as "Scientific Secretary & Chief S&T" with the Pakistan Council for Science and Technology (1995–98).
From 1998 to 2017 he was the Founder Rector of the COMSATS University Islamabad (CUI), which was awarded Charter by the Government of Pakistan in 2000. After retiring from CUI, he is serving as the Executive Director of COMSATS, since March 2017.

Awards and recognition
 Sitara-i-Imtiaz (Star of Excellence) Award by the President of Pakistan in 2006.
 Hilal-i-Imtiaz (Crescent of Excellence) Award by the President of Pakistan in 2015.
 The NCR Corporation award “IT Pioneer 1987-1995” in the year 2000.
 Doctorate of Science Honoris Causa, University of Lancaster, 2012.
  Al-Farabi gold medal, awarded by the Academic Council of Al-Farabi Kazakh National University (KazNU), 2018.
 Center of Islamic Finance - Special Award in 2017

Allegations
Dr S. M. Junaid Zaidi served as the chairman of the controversial National Testing Service (NTS) for over 15 years. He got embroiled in a corruption and malpractice scandal of the NTS and faced charges in the accountability court. Dr Junaid Zaidi has also come under severe criticism from a parliamentary committee, a sub-committee of the Public Accounts Committee (PAC) for his central role in the controversial Dual Degree programme (DDP) which was started illegally without the approval of Higher Education Commission and put at stake the future of 2,532 students. There have been allegations of money-laundering of nearly 6 million Pounds in the DDP case which is being investigated by the Federal Investigation Agency (FIA).

In 2018, the Minister of State for Science & Technology, Mir Dostain Khan Domki, claimed in the media that Comsats University and NTS were being run by a "mafia" who were involved in corruption.

References

External links 
 Founder rector of CIIT Founder rector of CIIT
Profile Of The Executive Director (S. M. Junaid Zaidi) on COMSATS.ORG website

1949 births
Living people
Pakistani educators
Pakistani information theorists
Pakistani scientists
University of the Punjab alumni
Alumni of the University of Birmingham
People from Rawalpindi District
Recipients of Sitara-i-Imtiaz
Recipients of Hilal-i-Imtiaz